The ITV Nightly News was the nightly news programme on British television network ITV, produced by ITN and broadcast Monday to Friday at 11:00pm. The 20-minute bulletin, originally presented by Dermot Murnaghan, was introduced as part of a major overhaul of news on ITV that saw its 5:40pm Early Evening News and prestigious News at Ten programmes axed.

These changes proved to be extremely unpopular with viewers and viewing figures declined. The ITV Nightly News was axed after less than two years and replaced by a reintroduced ITV News at Ten in order to halt the ratings loss. The revived 10:00pm bulletin followed the same 20-minute format as the ITV Nightly News, and although initially successful, eventually faltered in the ratings due to haphazard scheduling and delayed start times. The ITV News at Ten was replaced on 2 February 2004 by the ITV News at 10:30. On 14 January 2008, The Late News was properly reinstated to the ITV schedules.

Presenters

References

1999 British television series debuts
2001 British television series endings
ITN
ITV news shows